This is a complete list of FIS Alpine Ski World Cup winners of women's discipline titles, the list is completed by the second and third classified.

Podiums standings

Season-end podiums

Slalom

In the following table ladies's slalom World Cup season-end podiums since first season in 1967.

Downhill
In the following table ladies's downhill World Cup season-end podiums since first season in 1967.

Giant slalom
In the following table ladies's giant slalom World Cup season-end podiums since first season in 1967.

Super G
In the following table ladies's Super-G World Cup season-end podiums since first season in 1986.

Combined
In the following table ladies's combined World Cup season-end podiums since first season in 1975.

Parallel
In the following table ladies's Parallel World Cup season-end podiums since first season in 2020.

See also
List of FIS Alpine Ski World Cup winners of men's discipline titles
List of FIS Alpine Ski World Cup men's champions
List of FIS Alpine Ski World Cup women's champions

References

External links

Ski-db.com - World Cup results database

Women's discipline
World Cup, Women
Lists of sportsmen
Lists of skiers
Lists of female skiers
FIS